Dumești is a commune in Vaslui County, Western Moldavia, Romania. It is composed of four villages: Dumești, Dumeștii Vechi, Schinetea and Valea Mare.

References

External links

Communes in Vaslui County
Localities in Western Moldavia